Crassispira is a genus of small predatory sea snails with narrow, high-spired shells, marine gastropod mollusks in the  family Pseudomelatomidae.

Taxonomy
The small blackish Drillias so common in Panamic waters, of which Pleurotoma bottae Valenciennes is the type, were brought under the name of Crassispira Swainson, 1840 by W.H. Dall in 1918.

Description
Most species in this genus have a tall spire and a truncated anterior canal. The ribs are overridden by spirals, forming beads or nodules. Under the subsutural keel is the sinus area rather smooth.

The small shell is subclavate and tuberculated. The spire is thick and, lengthened. The outer lip shows a slight sinus above and is thickened internally at the top and the bottom. The top of the inner lip has a thick pad. The basal channel is slightly defined.

The shell is medium-sized. The aperture is moderately long and wide, scarcely contracted at the base, forming a suggestion of a siphonal canal, moderately emarginate at the base.  The siphonal fasciole is slightly bulging. The body whorl is varicose near the outer lip. The anal sinus is deep and narrow. The apex is semicircular and lies some distance from the suture below thread on the anal fasciole. The base of outer lip bears a very shallow, broad sinus, or stromboid notch. The inner lip is detached. The parietal callus is thickened adjoining the anal sinus. The sculpture consists of narrow axial ribs, between which the spiral threads or grooves. The anal fasciole bears  a strong spiral cord. (Based on original figures, Kiener, Coquilles vivantes, Pleurotoma, pp. 33–34, pi. 15, fig. 2, 1839.) 

The shell has a strong subsutural collar, a moderately narrow but strongly concave subsutural slope, strong axial ribs that do not cross the subsutural slope, and strong spiral threads between the axial ribs.

Species
Species within the genus Crassispira are numerous. According to the World Register of Marine Species (WoRMS), they include:

 Crassispira abdera (Dall, 1919)
 † Crassispira abundans Conrad, 1840  
 † Crassispira acuticosta (Nyst, 1845)
 Crassispira adana (Bartsch, 1950)
 † Crassispira aegis Woodring, 1928  
 Crassispira aequatorialis Thiele, 1925
 Crassispira angelettii Bozzetti, 2008
 † Crassispira angulosa (Deshayes, 1834)
 † Crassispira annella Woodring, 1928 
 Crassispira ansonae Wells, 1990
 Crassispira apicata (Reeve, 1845)
 Crassispira appressa (Carpenter, 1864)
 Crassispira apta Thiele, 1925
 † Crassispira armoricensis (Cossmann, 1896)
 † Crassispira aster Lozouet, 2015 
 Crassispira asthenes Faber, 2007
 Crassispira aurea Kantor et al. 2017
 Crassispira ballenaensis Hertlein & Strong, 1951
 † Crassispira bataviana Martin, 1895  
 Crassispira bernardi Fernandes et al., 1995
 † Crassispira berthelini (de Boury, 1899)
 Crassispira bifurca (Smith E. A., 1888)
 † Crassispira birmanica Vredenburg, 1921 
 Crassispira blanquilla Fallon, 2011
 † Crassispira boadicea (Dall, 1900) 
 † Crassispira borealis (Kautsky, 1925) 
 Crassispira bottae (Valenciennes in Kiener, 1840)
 Crassispira bridgesi Dall, 1919
 † Crassispira brocchii (Bellardi & Michelotti, 1841) 
 Crassispira bruehli Stahlschmidt & Fraussen, 2014
 Crassispira brujae Hertlein & Strong, 1951
 † Crassispira calligona (Maury, 1910) 
 Crassispira callosa (Kiener, 1840)
 Crassispira cana Fallon, 2011
  † Crassispira capella Olsson, 1930
 Crassispira carbonaria (Reeve, 1843)
 Crassispira cerithina (Anton, 1838)
 Crassispira cerithoidea (Carpenter, 1857)
 Crassispira chacei Hertlein & Strong, 1951
 Crassispira chazaliei (Dautzenberg, 1900)
 Crassispira coelata (Hinds, 1843)
 Crassispira comasi Fernández-Garcés & Rolán, 2010
 † Crassispira conica Jung, 1965  
 Crassispira consociata (E.A. Smith, 1877)
 † Crassispira constricta Vredenburg, 1921 
 † Crassispira contabulata Cossmann, 1889 
 Crassispira coracina McLean & Poorman, 1971
 Crassispira cortezi Shasky & Campbell, 1964
 Crassispira cubana (Melvill, 1923)
 Crassispira currani McLean & Poorman, 1971
 † Crassispira cymation Woodring, 1970 
 † Crassispira daguini (Peyrot, 1931)
 † Crassispira dalabeensis Vredenburg, 1921 
 † Crassispira danjouxii (Baudon, 1853)
 † Crassispira degrangei (Peyrot, 1931)
 Crassispira discors (Sowerby I, 1834)
 Crassispira dysoni (Reeve, 1846)
 Crassispira elatior (C. B. Adams, 1845)
 Crassispira epicasta Dall, 1919
 Crassispira erebus Pilsbry & Lowe, 1932
 Crassispira erigone Dall, 1919
 † Crassispira erronea Cossmann, 1902
 Crassispira eurynome Dall, 1919
 † Crassispira finitima (de Boury, 1899)
 Crassispira flavescens (Reeve, 1843)
 Crassispira flavocarinata (Smith E. A., 1882)
 Crassispira flavocincta (C. B. Adams, 1850)
 Crassispira flavonodulosa (Smith E. A., 1879)
 Crassispira funebralis Fernandes et al., 1995
 † Crassispira furcata (Lamarck, 1804) 
 Crassispira fuscescens (Reeve, 1843)
 Crassispira fuscobrevis Rolán, Ryall & Horro, 2007
 Crassispira fuscocincta (C. B. Adams, 1850)
 †  Crassispira girgillus Dolfus, 1899 
 † Crassispira glaphyrella (Cossmann & Pissarro, 1900)
 † Crassispira granulata (Lamarck, 1804)  
 Crassispira greeleyi (Dall, 1901)
 † Crassispira grignonensis (Cossmann, 1889)
 † Crassispira guayana Pilsbry & Olsson, 1941 
 Crassispira guildingii (Reeve, 1845)
 Crassispira hanleyi (Carpenter, 1857)
 Crassispira harfordiana (Reeve, 1843)
 Crassispira harpularia (Desmoulins, 1842)
 † Crassispira hataii MacNeil, 1960 
 † Crassispira hispaniolae (Maury, 1917)  
 Crassispira hondurasensis (Reeve, 1846)
 Crassispira hosoi (Okutani, 1964)
  † Crassispira hypermeces (Cossmann, 1889) 
 Crassispira incrassata (Sowerby I, 1834)
 † Crassispira inflexa (Lamarck, 1804)
 Crassispira integra Thiele, 1925
 † Crassispira iravadica Vredenburg, 1921 
 † Crassispira ischnomorpha (Cossmann & Pissarro, 1900)
 †  Crassispira jamaicense Guppy, 1866 
 † Crassispira kachhensis Vredenburg, 1925 
 † Crassispira kamaensis Vredenburg, 1921 
 Crassispira kluthi Jordan, 1936
 † Crassispira labroplicata (Cossmann, 1896)
 Crassispira laevisulcata Von Maltzan, 1883
 † Crassispira lagouardensis Lozouet, 2015 
 Crassispira latiriformis (Melvill, 1923)
 Crassispira latizonata (Smith E. A., 1882)
 Crassispira lavanonoensis Bozzetti, 2008
 † Crassispira lavillei (de Boury, 1899) 
 † Crassispira lepta (Edwards, 1861) 
 † Crassispira lesbarritzensis Lozouet, 2015
 † Crassispira logani Dey, 1961 
 † Crassispira lomata Woodring, 1928 
 † Crassispira losquemadica (Maury, 1917)  
 † Crassispira lozoueti (Tucker & Le Renard, 1993) 
 Crassispira luctuosa (d'Orbigny, 1847)
  †  Crassispira lyopleura McNeil, 1984
 Crassispira mackintoshi Fallon, 2011
 † Crassispira maonisriparum (Maury, 1917) 
 † Crassispira margaritula (Deshayes, 1834)
 Crassispira martiae McLean & Poorman, 1971
 Crassispira masinoi Fallon, 2011
 Crassispira maura (Sowerby I, 1834)
 † Crassispira mausseneti (Cossmann, 1889) 
 Crassispira mayaguanaensis Fallon, 2011
 † Crassispira mekranica Vredenburg, 1925 
 Crassispira melonesiana (Dall & Simpson, 1901)
 Crassispira mennoi Jong & Coomans, 1988
 † Crassispira meunieri (Maury, 1910) 
 Crassispira microstoma Smith, 1882
  † Crassispira mindegyiensi Vredenburg, 1921 
 Crassispira monilecosta Fernandes et al., 1995
 Crassispira montereyensis (Stearns, 1871)
 Crassispira multicostata Fallon, 2011
 † Crassispira myaukmigonensis Vredenburg, 1921 
 † Crassispira nana (Deshayes, 1834) 
 Crassispira nigerrima (Sowerby I, 1834)
 Crassispira nigrescens (C. B. Adams, 1845)
 Crassispira nina Thiele, 1925
 † Crassispira nodulosa (Lamarck, 1804)  
 † Crassispira obliquata (Cossmann, 1889)  
 Crassispira ochrobrunnea Melvill, 1923
 † Crassispira octocrassicosta Lozouet, 2017 
 Crassispira oliva Fernandes et al., 1995
 † Crassispira oxyacrum (Cossmann, 1889) 
 † Crassispira passaloides (Cossmann, 1902)  
 Crassispira pellisphocae (Reeve, 1845)
 † Crassispira perrugata Dall, 1890  
 Crassispira pini Fernandes et al., 1995
 † Crassispira plateaui (Cossmann, 1889) 
 Crassispira pluto Pilsbry & Lowe, 1932
  † Crassispira ponida Woodring, 1928
 Crassispira premorra (Dall, 1889)
 Crassispira procera Kantor et al., 2017
 † Crassispira promensis Noetling, 1901 
 † Crassispira propeangulosa (Cossmann, 1889)
 Crassispira pseudocarbonaria Nolf, 2009
 Crassispira pseudocarinata (Reeve, 1845)
 † Crassispira pseudodanjouxi Brébion, 1992
 † Crassispira pseudoprincipalis (Yokoyama, 1920) 
 Crassispira pulchrepunctata Stahlschmidt & Bozzetti, 2007
 Crassispira quadrifasciata (Reeve, 1845)
 † Crassispira quoniamensis (Boussac in Périer, 1941) 
 † Crassispira raricostulata (Deshayes, 1865) 
 Crassispira recurvirostrata Kuroda, 1972
 Crassispira rhythmica Melvill, 1927
 † Crassispira ritanida Mansfield, 1925  
 Crassispira rubidofusca (Schepman, 1913)
 Crassispira rudis (Sowerby I, 1834)
 Crassispira rugitecta (Dall, 1918)
 Crassispira rustica (Sowerby I, 1834)
 Crassispira sacerdotalis Rolan & Fernandes, 1992
 Crassispira safagaensis Kilburn & Dekker, 2008
  † Crassispira sanctistephani Lozouet, 2017
 Crassispira sandrogorii Ryall, Horro & Rolán, 2009
 Crassispira sanibelensis Bartsch & Rehder, 1939
 Crassispira scala Kantor et al., 2017
 Crassispira schillingi (Weinkauff & Kobelt, 1876)
 † Crassispira seiuncta (Bellardi, 1877) 
 † Crassispira semicolon (Sowerby I, 1816)
 Crassispira semigranosa (Reeve, 1846)
 Crassispira semiinflata (Grant & Gale, 1931)
 Crassispira sinensis (Hinds, 1843)
 Crassispira soamanitraensis Bozzetti, 2008
 Crassispira somalica Morassi & Bonfitto, 2013
 † Crassispira starri Hertlein, 1927  
 † Crassispira strangulata Harzhauser, Raven & Landau, 2018 
 † Crassispira streptophora Bayan, 1873
 † Crassispira subbataviana Vredenburg, 1921 
 † Crassispira subgranulosa (d'Orbigny, 1850) 
 † Crassispira subpromensis Vredenburg, 1921  
 † Crassispira suffecta Pezant, 1909 
 † Crassispira sulcata (Lamarck, 1804) 
 Crassispira sundaica Thiele, 1925
 Crassispira takeokensis (Otuka, 1949)
 Crassispira tasconium (Melvill & Standen, 1901)
 † Crassispira tenuicrenata (Cossmann, 1902)
 Crassispira tepocana Dall, 1919
 † Crassispira terebra (Basterot, 1825)
 † Crassispira tittabweensis Vredenburg, 1921  
 † Crassispira toulai (Cossmann, 1913)
 Crassispira trencarti Ryall, Horro & Rolán, 2009
 Crassispira trimariana Pilsbry & Lowe, 1932
 † Crassispira tuckeri Le Renard, 1994
 Crassispira tuckerana Bonfitto & Morassi, 2011
 Crassispira turricula (Sowerby I, 1834)
 † Crassispira tyloessa Woodring, 1970  
 Crassispira unicolor (Sowerby I, 1834)
 † Crassispira vasseuri (Cossmann, 1896)
 Crassispira verbernei Jong & Coomans, 1988
 Crassispira vexillum (Reeve, 1845)
 Crassispira vezzaroi Cossignani, 2014
 † Crassispira virodunensis Lozouet, 2017 
 † Crassispira woodringi Olsson, 1930 
 Crassispira xanti Hertlein & Strong, 1951

Nomen nudum
 Crassispira eous Ekdale, 1974 
 Species brought into synonymy 
 Crassispira adamsi De Jong & Coomans, 1988: synonym of Crassispira elatior (C. B. Adams, 1845) (Unnecessary replacement name for Pleurotoma elatior C.B. Adams, 1845, believed to be preoccupied by P. elatior d'Orbigny, "1842" [in fact 1847])
 Crassispira adamsiana Pilsbry & Lowe, 1932: synonym of Crassispira harfordiana (Reeve, 1843)
 Crassispira aesopus (Schepman, 1913): synonym of Inquisitor aesopus (Schepman, 1913)
 Crassispira affinis Reeve, 1846 junior homonym of Crassispira flavescens (Reeve, 1845)
 Crassispira albomaculata (d'Orbigny, 1847): synonym of Pilsbryspira nodata (C. B. Adams, 1850)
 Crassispira albonodulosa (E. A. Smith, 1904): synonym of Psittacodrillia albonodulosa (E. A. Smith, 1904)
 Crassispira albovallosa Carpenter, 1856: synonym of Crassispira rudis (Sowerby I, 1834)
 Crassispira amathea Dall, 1919: synonym of Pilsbryspira amathea (Dall, 1919)
 Crassispira anthamilla Melvill, 1923: synonym of Crassispira chazaliei (Dautzenberg, 1900)
 Crassispira arsinoe Dall, 1919: synonym of Pilsbryspira arsinoe (Dall, 1919)
 Crassispira aureonodosa Pilsbry & Lowe, 1932: synonym of Pilsbryspira aureonodosa (Pilsbry & Lowe, 1932)
 Crassispira bacchia Dall, 1919: synonym of Pilsbryspira bacchia (Dall, 1919)
 Crassispira bairstowi (Sowerby III, 1886): synonym of Psittacodrillia bairstowi (Sowerby III, 1886)
 Crassispira bandata (Nowell-Usticke, 1971): synonym of Crassispira latizonata (E. A. Smith, 1882)
 Crassispira bandata (Nowell-Usticke, 1969) : synonym of Monilispira bandata (Nowell-Usticke, 1969)
 Crassispira barkliensis Adams, 1869: synonym of Drillia barkliensis (Adams, 1869)
 Crassispira bittium Dall, 1924: synonym of Ceritoturris bittium (Dall, 1924) (original combination)
 † Crassispira calligonoides Gardner, 1938: synonym of † Hindsiclava calligonoides Gardner, 1938
 Crassispira cancellata Carpenter, 1864: synonym of Crassispira pellisphocae (Reeve, 1845)
 Crassispira candace Dall, 1919: synonym of Pyrgospira candace (Dall, 1919)
 Crassispira caribbaea (E.A. Smith, 1882): synonym of Buchema interstrigata (Smith E.A., 1882)
 Crassispira cornuta Sowerby I, 1834: synonym of Crassispira nigerrima (Sowerby I, 1834)
 Crassispira cubensis Smith, 1882: synonym of Crassispira kluthi Jordan, 1936
 Crassispira cuprea Reeve, 1843: synonym of Crassispira fuscescens (Reeve, 1843)
 Crassispira diversa (E. A. Smith, 1882): synonym of Psittacodrillia diversa (E. A. Smith, 1882)
 Crassispira drangai Schwengel, 1951: synonym of Strictispira drangai (Schwengel, 1951)
 Crassispira ebenina Dall, 1883: synonym of Strictispira solida C.B. Adams, 1850
 Crassispira ericana Hertlein & Strong, 1951: synonym of Strictispira ericana (Hertlein & Strong, 1951)
 Crassispira flavescens Reeve, 1846: synonym of Crassispira affinis (Reeve, 1846)
 Crassispira flavonodosa Pilsbry & H. N. Lowe, 1932: synonym of Crassispira eurynome Dall, 1919
 Crassispira flucki (Brown & Pilsbry, 1913): synonym of Pilsbryspira flucki (Brown & Pilsbry, 1913)
 Crassispira fonseca Pilsbry and Lowe, 1932: synonym of Pilsbryspira atramentosa
 Crassispira granulosa Sowerby I, 1834: synonym of Buchema granulosa (Sowerby I, 1834)
 Crassispira hermanita Pilsbry & Lowe, 1932: synonym of Maesiella hermanita (Pilsbry & Lowe, 1932)
 Crassispira hottenta (E. A. Smith, 1882): synonym of Clavus hottentotus (E. A. Smith, 1882)
 Crassispira hottentota (E. A. Smith, 1882): synonym of Clavus hottentotus (E. A. Smith, 1882)
 Crassispira inaequistriata Li, 1930: synonym of Crassispira maura (Sowerby I, 1834)
 Crassispira jungi Macsotay & Campos Villarroel, 2001: synonym of Hindsiclava jungi (Macsotay & Campos Villarroel, 2001)
 Crassispira kandai Kuroda, 1950: synonym of Pilsbryspira kandai (Kuroda, 1950)
 Crassispira layardi (Sowerby III, 1897): synonym of Crassiclava layardi (Sowerby III, 1897)
 Crassispira leucocyma (Dall, 1884): synonym of Pilsbryspira leucocyma (Dall, 1884)
 Crassispira loxospira Pilsbry & Lowe, 1932: synonym of Pilsbryspira loxospira (Pilsbry & Lowe, 1932)
 Crassispira lysidia (Duclos, 1850): synonym of Monilispira lysidia (Duclos, 1850)
 Crassispira mesoleuca Rehder, 1943: synonym of Crassispira cubana (Melvill, 1923)
 Crassispira monilifera (Carpenter, 1857): synonym of Monilispira monilifera (Carpenter, 1857)
 Crassispira monilis (Bartsch & Rehder, 1939): synonym of Pilsbryspira monilis (Bartsch & Rehder, 1939)
 Crassispira nigricans Dall, 1919: synonym of Crassispira maura (Sowerby I, 1834)
 Crassispira nymphia Pilsbry & Lowe, 1932: synonym of Pilsbryspira nymphia (Pilsbry & Lowe, 1932)
 Crassispira ochsneri (Hertlein & Strong, 1949: synonym of Cleospira ochsneri (Hertlein & Strong, 1949)
 Crassispira ostrearum (Stearns, 1872): synonym of Pyrgospira ostrearum (Stearns, 1872)
 Crassispira palliata (Reeve, 1845): synonym of Crassispira kluthi Jordan, 1936
 Crassispira pardalis Hinds, 1844: synonym of Anachis pardalis (Hinds, 1843) 
 Crassispira paxillus (Reeve, 1845): synonym of Strictispira paxillus  (Reeve, 1845)
 Crassispira perla Smith, 1947: synonym of Crassispira maura (Sowerby I, 1834)
 Crassispira phasma Schwengel, 1940: synonym of Fenimorea phasma (Schwengel, 1940) (original combination)
 † Crassispira pseudospirata (d'Orbigny, 1850): synonym of † Drilliola pseudospirata (d'Orbigny, 1850) 
 Crassispira quadrilirata (E. A. Smith, 1882): synonym of Carinodrillia quadrilirata (E. A. Smith, 1882)
 Crassispira reigeni Bartsch, 1950: synonym of Zonulispira grandimaculata (C.B. Adams, 1852)
 Crassispira rufovaricosa Kuroda, Habe & Oyama, 1971: synonym of Inquisitor rufovaricosa (Kuroda, Habe & Oyama, 1971)
 Crassispira saulcydiana (Récluz, 1851): synonym of Drillia umbilicata Gray, 1838
 Crassispira solida (C. B. Adams, 1850): synonym of Clathrodrillia solida (C. B. Adams, 1850)
 Crassispira sowerbyi Reeve, 1843: synonym of Crassispira turricula (Sowerby I, 1834)
 Crassispira stilmani Shasky, 1971: synonym of Strictispira stillmani Shasky, 1971
 Crassispira strigata Sowerby II, 1874: synonym of Drillia barkliensis (H. Adams, 1869)
 Crassispira sultana Thiele, 1925: synonym of Paradrillia sultana (Thiele, 1925) (original combination)
 Crassispira tabogaensis Bartsch, 1931: synonym of Crassispira kluthi Jordan, 1936
 Crassispira tampaensis Bartsch & Rehder, 1939: synonym of Pyrgospira tampaensis (Bartsch & Rehder, 1939)
 Crassispira tangolaensis Hertlein, L.G. & A.M. Strong, 1951: synonym of Crassispira unicolor (Sowerby I, 1834) 
 † Crassispira terebra Basterot, 1825: synonym of † Drillia terebra (Basterot, 1825) 
 Crassispira thiarella Kiener, 1840: synonym of Crassispira nigerrima (Sowerby I, 1834)
 Crassispira tripter Maltzan, 1883: synonym of Drillia tripter Von Maltzan, 1883
 Crassispira tuckeri Bonfitto & Morassi, 2004: synonym of Crassispira tuckerana Bonfitto & Morassi, 2011
 Crassispira walteri Smith M., 1946: synonym of Clathrodrillia walteri (Smith M., 1946)

References 

 Reeve, L.A. 1843–1846. Monograph of the genus Pleurotoma . Reeve Brothers, London.
 Kantor, Medeinskaya, J.D Taylor - 1997, Foregut anatomy and relationships of the Crassispirinae (Gastropoda, Conoidea); Bull. nat. Hist. Mus. London (Zool.)  63 (1): 55-92

External links
  W.H. Dall (1918) Notes on the nomenclature of the mollusks of the family Turritidae; Proceedings of the United States National Museum v. 54 (1918); p. 317
 James McLean, A Revised Classification of the Family Turridae, with the Proposal of New Subfamilies, Genera, and Subgenera from the Eastern Pacific ; The Veliger vol. 14 (1)

External links
 
 Bartsch, Paul, and Harald A. Rehder. "New turritid mollusks from Florida." Proceedings of the United States National Museum (1939).
 Bouchet, P.; Kantor, Y. I.; Sysoev, A.; Puillandre, N. (2011). A new operational classification of the Conoidea (Gastropoda). Journal of Molluscan Studies. 77(3): 273-308
 Swainson W. (1840) A treatise on malacology or shells and shell-fish. London, Longman. viii + 419 pp
 Worldwide Mollusc Species Data Base: Pseudomelatomidae
 P.J. Fallon, Descriptions and illustrations of some new and poorly known turrids (Turridae) of the tropical northwestern Atlantic. Part 2. Genus Crassispira Swainson, 1840 subgenera Monilispira Bartsch and Rehder, 1939 and Dallspira Bartsch, 1950; The Nautilus 125, 2011

 
Pseudomelatomidae
Taxonomy articles created by Polbot